These are the results for the boys' combined team event at the 2018 Summer Youth Olympics.

Results

Team Time Trial

Road Race

Cross-country eliminator

Qualification

1/8 finals

Heat 1

Heat 2

Heat 3

Heat 4

Heat 5

Heat 6

Heat 7

Heat 8

Quarterfinals

Heat 1

Heat 2

Heat 3

Heat 4

Semifinals

Heat 1

Heat 2

Finals
Small final

Big final

Cross-country Short Circuit

Qualification

Heat 1

Heat 2

Final

Criterium

Overall Team Classification

References
Time trial 
Road race 
Cross-country eliminator qualification 
Cross-country eliminator bracket 
Cross-country eliminator points 
Cross-country Short Circuit Qualification 
Cross-country Short Circuit Final 
Criterium 
Total points 

Cycling at the 2018 Summer Youth Olympics